Cobbs Cross is a village in Saint Paul Parish, Antigua and Barbuda.

Demographics 
Cobbs Cross has one enumeration district, ED 71700 CobbsCross.

Census Data (2011) 
Source:

Individual

Household 
Cobbs Cross has 103 households.

References 

Populated places in Antigua and Barbuda
Saint Paul Parish, Antigua and Barbuda